Michurino is a rural locality (a village) in Lavrovskoye Rural Settlement, Sudogodsky District, Vladimir Oblast, Russia. The population was 14 as of 2010.

Geography 
Michurino is located 27 km north of Sudogda (the district's administrative centre) by road. Kiselnitsa is the nearest rural locality.

References 

Rural localities in Sudogodsky District